The 1952–53 season was Port Vale's 41st season of football in the English Football League, and their first season (fourth overall) back in the Third Division North, following their switch from the Third Division South. Using an incredibly settled squad (only nineteen players were used all season), manager Freddie Steele led the Vale to a second-place finish, just a single point from the promotion spot. Built upon an 'iron curtain defence', just 35 goals were conceded in 46 league games. All this was achieved with pretty much the same bottom-placed team that Steele inherited in December 1951.

Following from 9 February the previous season until 8 September the club racked up a club record streak of twelve consecutive home wins.

Overview

Third Division North
The pre-season saw the club switched from the Third Division South to the Third Division North, very much against the wishes of the directors, who believed a loss of income would follow. Manager Freddie Steele decided against making any new signings, and instead kept faith with the young team he had inherited the previous season. Offers were made for some of the young prospects, but none were accepted.

The season began with a 1–0 defeat at Valley Parade with a goal from Ray King's brother George, managed by Steele's predecessor Ivor Powell. This did not affect the team's spirits, as they went straight on to a seven match unbeaten run, conceding just three goals. Steele picked up an injury and so selected the versatile Basil Hayward to replace him. A shrewd move, Hayward would go on to become the club's top scorer. It took awhile to pay off however, as Vale went five games scoring just one goal. Steele attempted to sign a new forward, but to no avail. A 1–0 home defeat to wooden spoon contenders Accrington Stanley exemplified the club's trouble in front of goal, and also ended their record-breaking run of twelve consecutive home wins. Steele and trainer Ken Fish put the squad to work on the special fitness regime they devised, as the "Valiants" marched onwards.

Travelling to Boundary Park on 15 November, they beat Oldham Athletic 1–0, taking themselves up into third place. They dropped points during the Christmas period, though picked up a useful 4–1 win at Gresty Road on Boxing day. Three points out of a possible eight in February allowed leaders Oldham to pull away from the chasing Vale. In March Oldham and Grimsby Town struggled, and so Vale took advantage with six points from ten, conceding just three goals. With six of the final nine games at home, and all of the chasing pack yet to visit Burslem, the omens seemed good for promotion. Vale duly remained unbeaten until the season's end, however drawing five of these games proved not enough. The 4 April encounter with Oldham proved to be the title decider, Vale had dominated the game but conceded a fatal equalizing goal on 86 minutes. Two draws against strugglers Chester were also costly. Nevertheless, they finished strongly, hammering Grimsby Town 4–0, Reg Potts scoring with a lob from 35 yards out.

They finished second, a single point away from top spot. Steele's emphasis on teamwork had turned the team around, and earned the club its best finish since their relegation from the second tier in 1935–36. Their defensive record of 35 goals conceded was bettered only by Second Division Huddersfield Town. Their tally of 58 points was second only to the club's extraordinary 1929–30 campaign. Their main weakness was an average offence, though Hayward proved to be a revelation with 22 goals.

On 4 May, Vale played Potteries derby rivals Stoke City, who had just been relegated from the First Division. This Coronation Cup match ended in a 2–0 win for Stoke, with £1,053 raised for charity.

Finances
On the financial side, a £1,676 profit was recorded. This was due to a club record average attendance of 14,504 – which took gate receipts to £39,929 – and a £5,000 slash in the wage bill to £18,246. For once the club did not sell its best players, and yet it also made a profit. Steele was rewarded with a three-year contract. He again kept on almost all of the squad, with two exceptions being Jimmy Todd (Wellington Town) and Norman Hallam (Halifax Town).

Cup competitions
In the FA Cup, Third Division South Exeter City were beaten 2–1. However, in the Second Round league leaders Oldham Athletic won 3–0 in front of a season best 25,398 crowd at Vale Park – 8,000 of them Oldham supporters.

League table

Results
Port Vale's score comes first

Football League Third Division North

Results by matchday

Matches

FA Cup

Coronation Cup

Player statistics

Appearances

Top scorers

Transfers

Transfers in

Transfers out

References
Specific

General

Port Vale F.C. seasons
Port Vale